USS Highlands (APA-119) was a Haskell-class attack transport built and used by the US Navy in World War II.  She was a Victory ship design, VC2-S-AP5.  She was named after Highlands County, Florida, United States.

World War II service
Highlands was launched 8 July 1944 under Maritime Commission contract by California Shipbuilding Company, Wilmington, California; sponsored by Mrs. G. W. D. Dashiell; acquired by the Navy and commissioned 5 October 1944.

The new transport conducted shakedown training out of San Pedro until 30 October. Following a rigorous period of drills, which would serve her well in the months to come, Highlands sailed to San Francisco to embark her troops, and got underway 23 November for Hawaii.

Arriving Pearl Harbor 29 November, the ship again turned to amphibious training, in preparation for the epochal Iwo Jima landings, one of the most important steps in the Navy's island campaign that drove relentlessly toward Japan. Highlands sailed with her task group 27 January 1945 via Eniwetok for Saipan, where she arrived 11 February. Five days later she sailed for Iwo Jima and commenced unloading on the beaches the morning of 19 February. For the next 6 days the transport unloaded troops and supplies during the day and retired under escort cover each night. Japanese air attacks were heavy during this period, claiming escort carrier  in a kamikaze attack 21 February and damaging several other ships, including . In addition to her regular duties, Highlands received over 150 survivors of Bismarck Sea 22 February, as well as casualties from the hard-pressed Marine units ashore.

Highlands departed Iwo Jima 25 February and after debarking casualties at Saipan proceeded to Espiritu Santo, arriving 15 March 1945. There she took on fresh troops for the next major assault of the Pacific War, the invasion of Okinawa, called by Winston Churchill ". . . among the most intense and famous of military history." Highlands did not take part in the initial landings, arriving in the Ryukyus 3 April. The transport remained at Kerama Retto until 11 April, when she took part in the early morning assault on Tsugen Jima, a small but key island controlling the approaches to the large bay on Okinawa's east side. As Marines gained control of the island, Highlands took casualties on board, and moved directly off Hagushi beaches 12 April to disembark reserve troops. .During the 3 days that followed antiaircraft fire and smoke screens helped protect the transport from almost continuous air attack, and after completing her mission Highlands sailed for Saipan 16 April.

Arriving Saipan 20 April Highlands unloaded casualties and proceeded the next day to Ulithi. She departed 22 May for Guam and then Leyte, arriving in Leyte Gulf 31 May. The transport now busily prepared for the expected amphibious landings on the Japanese mainland, operations which were terminated by the Japanese surrender 15 August 1945. Highlands had been operating off Panay Island when the surrender came; she sailed 21 August to load occupation troops on Luzon. Highlands and other transports of her group entered Tokyo Bay the day of the formal ceremony, 2 September, and landed units of the 1st Cavalry Division on Japanese soil.

Highlands returned to the Philippine Islands and Okinawa for more occupation troops in September and after the clearing of mines from Japan's inland sea landed troops at Kure 6 October. The veteran ship sailed 11 October for Okinawa and San Diego carrying returnees, arriving in the United States 2 November. She made an additional voyage to Japanese ports 17 November-26 December, returning to San Francisco, and departed 11 January 1946 for the Panama Canal and Norfolk. Highlands arrived Hampton Roads 26 January, decommissioned 14 February and was placed in the Maritime Commission's National Defense Reserve Fleet, James River, Virginia.

Fate
Between 21 September and 23 November 1956 she was withdrawn from the Reserve Fleet for a Repair Program, GAA- Farrell Lines, and returned.  Ex-Highlands was sold for $111,560 to Union Minerals & Alloys Corporation for scrapping on 9 April 1973.  At 0935 EDT, on 11 June 1973 she was withdrawn from the Reserve Fleet and sent to the breaker's yard.

All that remains of Highlands is her brass builder's plate.

Awards
Highlands received two battle stars for World War II service.

References

External links
 US Naval Historical Center Highlands Photos

Victory ships
Ships built in Los Angeles
Haskell-class attack transports
World War II amphibious warfare vessels of the United States
Troop ships
Highlands County, Florida
1944 ships